The Six Mile Water is a river in southern County Antrim, Northern Ireland. It is an indirect tributary of the River Bann, via Lough Neagh.

Name
The river was historically called the Ollarbha and is known in Irish as Abhainn na bhFiodh ("river of the woods"), which was formerly anglicized 'Owenaview'.

Accounts vary as to the origin of the name. It is said to be named from a crossing point six Irish miles from Antrim, on the road to Carrickfergus. Another story is that it was named by English soldiers, who calculated that it was a six mile march from Carrickfergus Castle to the ford at Ballyclare.

Course and catchment
It rises in the hills west of Larne and north of Carrickfergus and descends gently westward, flowing through or close to the communities of Ballynure, Ballyclare, Doagh, Parkgate, Templepatrick, Dunadry and Antrim into Lough Neagh. A weir exists at Ballyclare where water was diverted to the paper mill. The Six Mile Water Park was constructed around the river in Ballyclare, in order that the river's frequent floods would not affect houses in the area. It has a catchment of 117 square miles.

Culture
The river is the subject of the song Six Mile Water, by the Metal band Therapy?. It appeared on their fifth full-length album Suicide Pact - You First released in 1999.

See also
List of rivers of Northern Ireland

References

External links
Geograph - Bridge over Six Mile Water, Antrim Photograph

Rivers of County Antrim